Blackstar is the reported codename of a secret United States orbital spaceplane system. The possible existence of the Blackstar program was reported in March 2006 by Aviation Week & Space Technology (Aviation Week, AWST) magazine; the magazine reported that the program had been underway since at least the early 1990s, and that the impetus for Blackstar was to allow the United States government to retain orbital reconnaissance capabilities jeopardized following the 1986 Challenger disaster. The article also said that the United States Air Force's Space Command was unaware of Blackstar, suggesting it was operated by an intelligence agency such as the National Reconnaissance Office.

Aviation Week speculated that such a spacecraft could also have offensive military capabilities, a concept colloquially known as "The Space Bomber". The magazine also stated that it was likely that Blackstar would be mothballed, although it is unclear whether this is due to cost or failure of the program.

The Aviation Week report was dismissed a few days later as "almost certainly bogus" and the project termed a "technical absurdity" by Jeffrey F. Bell in an article in Space Daily.

The Blackstar system
Aviation Week describes Blackstar as a two-stage-to-orbit system, the first stage of which is a delta-winged supersonic jet (which Aviation Week referred to as the SR-3). Its description of SR-3 is similar to the North American B-70 Valkyrie Mach 3 strategic bomber, and to patents filed in the 1980s by Boeing. The SR-3 would carry a second, smaller airframe, codenamed the XOV (eXperimental Orbital Vehicle) underneath, between its two laterally separated engine-banks, each containing 2 or 3 engines. This rocket-powered spaceplane, with similarities to the X-20 Dyna-Soar project, would be released by its mothership at an altitude of around 100,000 feet. The XOV would then reenter the atmosphere and glide back to any landing site where it would land horizontally on a conventional runway. This combination of jet-powered mothership and a smaller rocket-powered spaceplane resembles the civilian Tier One spaceplane system as well as NASA's X-15, but capable of much higher velocities and thus of attaining orbit. Readers are cautioned to examine the challenges involved in supersonic separation of vehicles as opposed to the more common subsonic separation of ordnance from aircraft, but this separation from the belly might be easier than from the top, which proved to be problematic on the Lockheed D-21/M-21.

The program

The primary use of a military spaceplane such as Blackstar would be to conduct high-altitude or orbital reconnaissance, allowing surprise overflights of foreign locations with very low risk of the spyplane being successfully engaged by existing air-defense systems. This is similar to the goals of the earlier U-2 and SR-71 Blackbird reconnaissance aircraft; in some circumstances such an overflight yields more information than a pass by a reconnaissance satellite, as the satellite's path is predictable, allowing sensitive material to be hidden.

Military analysts have suggested that a military spaceplane could also be used to place small satellites in orbit, to retrieve them, to provide a means of launching nuclear weapons from orbit, or to serve as a platform for exotic orbit-to-ground hypervelocity weapons. The small spaceplane described by Aviation Week appears to have only a very modest cargo capacity, limiting its use in such missions.

Aviation Week suggests that the huge costs of the Blackstar program were borne both by the Department of Defense's own black budget and by hiding the costs of Blackstar inside the procurement costs attached to acknowledged military purchases. To assist in this, and to allow politicians to deny the USAF operates such a vehicle, the Blackstar assets may nominally be owned and operated by the civilian defense contractors who built it. The magazine suggests that a consortium of Boeing and Lockheed is responsible for Blackstar.

It is unclear if the Blackstar program became fully operational, although it may have been so since the mid-1990s. Aviation Week'''s article speculated that the success of Blackstar explains the Government's willingness to cancel the SR-71 Blackbird and Air Force satellite-launch programs.

Similar aircraft

During the 1970s, when studies were underway which led to the specification of the Space Shuttle, most leading US aerospace contractors explored orbital spaceplane designs, some based on a two-stage design. The most serious of these was the Lockheed HGV under the X-24C program, which was a manned hypersonic vehicle dropped from underwing a B-52, even to the point of rumors that it had actually been flight tested, according to Encyclopedia Astronautica. With the adoption of the Space Shuttle design, these avenues appear to have been abandoned. The use of a spaceplane as part of the launching system to replace the Space Shuttle has been suggested in programs such as VentureStar.

Some of the details of the SR-3 resemble the rumored Brilliant Buzzard or “Mothership” aircraft, which was alleged to carry reconnaissance aircraft on top, rather than on the bottom as with the SR-3. The second stage of Brilliant Buzzard was considered a hypersonic aircraft, and the lengthening of runways at facilities such as Area 51 (taken by some as evidence of Aurora) could instead be necessary either to support SR-3's takeoff or XOV's landing.

In the late 1960s the North American Aircraft Corporation studied conceptual designs using the B-70 bomber for small space launch of an X-15 type rocket plane. These were abandoned as unpromising.

What is known, and a matter of public record, is that, through the 1980s and 1990s, the USAF did undertake a series of projects to study, research, develop and test demonstrator vehicles capable of SSTO (single-stage-to-orbit) and TSTO (two-stage-to-orbit) missions. These programs were code-named, in order, Science dawn, Science realm, and Copper canyon, and involved the development of three different competitive demonstrator vehicles. It was at the conclusion of Copper canyon's design phase that President Reagan proposed the X-30 NASP, which is claimed to have been used to pay for development of this spaceplane.

According to one declassified Rand Corp. report, two of the three vehicles failed to achieve their full flight envelope (i.e. couldn't make orbit), while the third, an "assisted SSTO", did achieve orbital capability. Furthermore, three code-named programs to design the stealthing of these three vehicles fell under the programs known as Have blinders I, II and III. All of these programs can be found in US military budget documents with associated budget account numbers for years in the 1980s up into the mid-1990s (in the case of Copper coast), though the code name was dropped from the account number in the mid-1990s, even though many millions were budgeted up until recent years.

Whether any of these vehicles were individually code named "Blackstar" is unknown at this time.

See also
 Boeing X-20 Dyna-Soar
 British Aerospace HOTOL
 Lockheed SR-71 Blackbird
 North American XB-70 Valkyrie
 Project ISINGLASS
 Rockwell X-30 National Aerospace Plane
 Saenger (spacecraft)
 VentureStar

References

Bibliography
 .

External links
 The Space Review: Six blind men in a zoo: Aviation Week’s mythical Blackstar Dwayne A. Day, The Space Review'', Monday, March 13, 2006
 RobotPig.net - TSTO spaceplanes presentation of a Boeing TSTO patent, the Blackstar TSTO and the respective technologies
 The Register: Blackstar: the US space conspiracy that never was?, Lester Haines, April 24, 2006

Spaceplanes
Crewed spacecraft
1990s United States experimental aircraft
Rocket-powered aircraft